Madeleine Sumption  is a British political scientist who is Director of the Migration Observatory at the University of Oxford, which provides analysis of migration in the UK for public and policy audiences. Her research focuses on labour migration and the economic and social impacts of migration policies.

Early life and education 
Sumption studied Russian and French at the University of Oxford. She earned a master's degree at the University of Chicago School of Public Policy.

Research and career 
Sumption worked as Director of the Research at the Migration Policy Institute in Washington, D.C.. Her research considers labour migration and the economic impact of migration policies. She studied the migration impacts of Brexit. She is Director of the Migration Observatory at the University of Oxford. 

Sumption has investigated the experiences of the children of immigrants in the United Kingdom and United States. As the both are high-immigration nations, children of immigrants make up around one quarter of young children. There is evidence that the children of immigrants perform better than their parents, and earn more than their non-immigrant peers. However, there are indicators that by 2030 the second generation will learn less than their non-immigrant peers. To improve social mobility, Sumption proposed considering the capacity of immigrants to integrate in selection criteria, to focus on early education and language training and to provide permanent (not temporary) visas. Despite Brexit reducing net EU migration to the UK, in late 2022 UK net migration was unexpectedly high. Sumption argued that this was because of the humanitarian crises in Ukraine and Hong Kong.

Sumption is chair of the Migration Statistics User Forum, and a member of the Government of the United Kingdom Migration Advisory Committee.

Selected publications

Awards and honours
Sumption was appointed Member of the Order of the British Empire (MBE) in the 2018 New Year Honours for services to social science.

Personal life 
Her father is Jonathan Sumption, Lord Sumption.

References 

Year of birth missing (living people)
Living people
English political scientists
Women political scientists
Alumni of the University of Oxford
University of Chicago Harris School of Public Policy alumni
Members of the Order of the British Empire
Academics of the University of Oxford